Kawasoti  is a Municipality in Nawalparasi District in the Lumbini Zone of southern Nepal. The municipality was formed by merging the existing Kawasoti, Shivamandir, Pithauli, Agryouli VDCs. At the time of the 1991 Nepal census it had a population of 6886 people living in 1169 individual households.

References

Populated places in Parasi District